Maj Rati Keteki  is a 2017 Indian Assamese drama film written and directed by Santwana Bardoloi. The film stars Adil Hussain in the lead role. Hussain wins National Film Award – Special Mention (feature film) at 64th National Film Awards   for acting in this film.

Plot
After a long gap of more than ten years, renowned writer Priyendu Hazarika returns to the town where once he was inspired to begin his journey as a writer. A book at times imitates the author's life. The book in question is an imaginary one, "A River Runs Ashore", woven into a meta-narrative. Memories stir and he remembers people he loved and lost. The conceit of his frequent meandering into memories gives shape to a saga of childhood and loss set in rustic North Guwahati. He admits to lacking the courage to weave a painful, harsh truth into his stories. At the end of the day however, he decides to face his own truth, alone, away from the appreciative audience.

Cast
Adil Hussain
Shakil Imtiaz
Mahendra Rabha
Sulakshana Baruah
Pranami Bora
Rahul Gautam Sharma
Kasvi Sharma

References

External links 
 

2017 films
Best Assamese Feature Film National Film Award winners
2010s Assamese-language films